Arbor Hills Nature Preserve is a 200-acre park in Plano, Texas. It has several amenities including 3 miles of paved hiking trail, 3 miles of unpaved hiking trail, a 2.8 mile off-road bike trail, restrooms, a covered pavilion, and a playground. The pavilion can be reserved for special events. An observation tower provides a bird's eye view of the park. There are three regions in the park: Blackland Prairie, Riparian Forest, and Upland Forest. A pond in the preserve is named after Vasil Levski. Birds that live in the park include killdeer, owls, woodpeckers, egrets, herons, scissor-tailed flycatcher, and turkey vulture. Many other wildlife such as deer, coyotes, snakes, bobcats, turtles, fish, and rabbits also live in the park.

References

Nature reserves in Texas
Protected areas of Denton County, Texas